Winifredia is a group of plants in the Restionaceae described as a genus in 1986. There is only one known species, Winifredia sola, endemic to the Island of Tasmania.

References

Restionaceae
Monotypic Poales genera
Endemic flora of Australia
Flora of Tasmania
Taxa named by Barbara G. Briggs
Taxa named by Lawrence Alexander Sidney Johnson